Insight Investment (Insight) is one of the largest global asset management companies, responsible for £683.0 billion of assets under management as of 30 September 2022, represented by the value of cash securities and other economic exposure managed for clients. It manages strategies which include fixed income, liability-driven investment (LDI), cash, absolute return, multi-asset, and equities. Insight is a subsidiary of The Bank of New York Mellon, a multinational financial services corporation.

The UK banking group HBOS formed Insight Investment in 2002 by merging its asset management arms, which included Clerical Medical Investment Management. In 2003, Insight Investment acquired Rothschild Asset Management, which specialised in fixed income investments. In 2009, BNY Mellon acquired Insight from Lloyds Banking Group, which formally acquired HBOS earlier that year. In 2013, Insight merged with Pareto Investment Management, a currency risk manager. In early 2015, BNY Mellon acquired US-based fixed income and solutions specialist Cutwater Asset Management. Insight is headquartered in London and has offices in Boston, Frankfurt, New York, San Francisco, Sydney and Tokyo.

Insight Investment was a founding signatory of the United Nations-supported Principles for Responsible Investment (PRI). Insight is a signatory to the UK Stewardship Code, administered by the Financial Reporting Council. Insight is also a signatory to the UN Global Compact.

History
Insight Investment was launched in 2002. It was formed from the merger of the asset management arms of UK banking group HBOS: Clerical Medical Investment Management, Halifax Fund Management and the investment division of Equitable Life. Douglas Ferrans was Insight's first CEO and played a significant role in its formation and launch.
 
In 2003, Insight acquired Rothschild Asset Management, which was well known for its fixed income solutions and multimanager funds, and property investment manager Gatehouse Investment Management.

In 2006, Insight demerged its property investment unit and floated it on the Aim market at the London Stock Exchange as Invista Real Estate Investment Management.

In 2007, Abdallah Nauphal became CEO of Insight. He already held a dual role as deputy CEO (from June 2006) and chief investment officer (from September 2003) of the company. He joined Insight as head of fixed income in April 2003 after the acquisition of Rothschild Asset Management, where he was chief investment officer for fixed income. He was previously head of fixed income at Schroder Investment Management.

In 2009, Insight's parent company HBOS was acquired by Lloyds Banking Group (Lloyds). Later that year, BNY Mellon acquired Insight Investment from Lloyds. Lloyds retained most of the equity assets managed by Insight and transferred them to Scottish Widows Investment Partnership, the group's primary in-house asset manager after the sale of Insight. This left Insight as an asset manager primarily focused on fixed income and LDI strategies. It transferred its headquarters in early 2011 to share a building with BNY Mellon in Blackfriars, London.

In 2012, Insight announced that it would merge with Pareto Investment Management, a currency risk manager with £27 billion of assets under management. The merger was complete at the beginning of 2013. Pareto was also owned by BNY Mellon.

In early 2015, BNY Mellon acquired US-based fixed income and solutions specialist Cutwater Asset Management.

In 2021, BNY Mellon Investment Management in partnership with Insight Investment announced plans to align Mellon Investments fixed income capabilities with Insight. In September 2021, Insight said c.£76bn of assets in fixed income capabilities across stable value, municipal, efficient beta and taxable fixed income strategies had been transferred to Insight. 

In July 2021, Insight Investment was named the asset manager whose brand was most respected in the institutional marketplace. Edelman’s Asset Management Brand Index, which looks at the top 50 international managers in the world by AUM, ranked Insight first with a brand score of 83 (out of 100).

Awards
Insight Investment has won over 40 industry awards since the beginning of 2019.

In 2022, Insight was ranked in first place for Overall LDI Quality for the 12th consecutive year by Greenwich Associates UK Investment Consultant Research. Insight was also ranked in first place for Overall Quality in Fixed Income: Insight has maintained a top decile ranking for Overall Quality in Fixed Income in every year since 2013.

Sponsorships
Insight Investment sponsors the Royal Academy Summer Exhibition, and the Royal Society's Science Book Prize.

Key people

 Abdallah Nauphal - CEO
 
 Andrew Giles – Executive Vice Chairman
 
 Andrew Kitchen – Chief Finance Officer

 Jon Eilbeck - Chief Operating Officer
 
 Lynne Dalgarno - Head of Human Resources
 
 Ayah Elmaazi - Head of Legal
 
 Adrian Grey - Global Chief Investment Officer
 
 Angus Woolhouse - Global Head of Distribution

 Mark Stancombe - Chief Risk Officer 

 Serkan Bektas - Head of Client Solutions Group 

 David Leduc - CEO Insight North America

References

External links
 Insight Investment website
 BNY Mellon Asset Management website

Financial services companies based in the City of London
Investment management companies of the United Kingdom
2013 mergers and acquisitions